The International Federation of Clinical Chemistry and Laboratory Medicine or IFCC is a global organization that promotes the fields of clinical chemistry and laboratory medicine. It was established in 1952 as the International Association of Clinical Biochemists to organize the various national societies of these fields. The organization aims to transcend the boundaries of the field of clinical chemistry and laboratory medicine, to build professionalism of members worldwide, to  disseminate information on ”best practice” at various levels of technology and of  economic development, to provide a forum of standardization and traceability, to enhance the scientific level and the quality of diagnosis and therapy for patients.

The IFCC membership comprises 95 national societies and is associated with 6 regional Federations, 55 corporate members and 21 affiliate members representing more than 45,000 laboratory medicine specialists worldwide.

Structure and organization
The IFCC carries out its objectives through its executive board, divisions, committees and working groups. Representatives from member organizations are volunteers, invited from throughout the world on the basis of their expertise.

Scientific Division (SD)
 Its mission is to advance the science of clinical chemistry and to apply it to the practice of Clinical Laboratory medicine
 Participate actively in the scientific programs of IFCC scientific meetings and Congresses
 Respond to scientific and technical needs of IFCC Member Societies, IFCC Corporate members and external agencies
 The Scientific Division of the IFCC instigates and promotes theoretical and practical developments in the field of standards and standardisation in clinical chemistry.

Education & Management Division (EMD)
Its mission is to provide IFCC members and the health-care community with education relevant to clinical chemistry and laboratory medicine. Current projects include:
 Visiting Lecturer Program
 Clinical Molecular Biology Courses
 Expanding knowledge in Evidence Based Medicine
 Managing the quality of Laboratory tests
 Courses and workshops in specialized areas

Communications and Publications Division (CPD)  
 Its mission is to provide worldwide communication about the  work of IFCC to clinical laboratory scientists, physicians and health policy –makers and to provide continuing education, materials and services.
 It is responsible for the IFCC  website  and the publication of the e -Journal (eJIFCC)
 The IFCC news and scientific documents are also published in peer-reviewed journals, newsletters and on the IFCC website.

Congresses and Conferences Committee (C-CC)
 Its mission is to provide  administration and management of all IFCC meeting activities and to review applications for IFCC Auspices from non IFCC conferences requesting such sponsorship
 Visit the IFCC website for a database of upcoming international and regional conferences

Key programs
 IFCC Reference Materials
 Distance Learning Program
 Visiting Lectureship Program
 Professional Scientific Exchange Program
 IFCC Speakers Bureau
 Roche/IFCC Travel Scholarships

See also
 Good Laboratory Practice (GLP)
 Institute for Reference Materials and Measurements (IRMM)
 International Laboratory Accreditation Cooperation
 ISO 15189
 Joint Committee for Traceability in Laboratory Medicine
 National Institute of Standards and Technology (NIST)
 Reference values

References

External links
 International Federation of Clinical Chemistry and Laboratory Medicine (IFCC)
 ISO15189.com
A brief history of the IFCC and its leaders.

Standards organisations in Italy
Accreditation in healthcare
Chemistry organizations
Clinical pathology
International medical and health organizations
Organizations established in 1952
1952 establishments in Italy